Highway 681 is a highway in the Canadian province of Saskatchewan. It runs from Highway 776 to Highway 335.

For a six-kilometre segment after its intersection with Highway 3, Highway 681 is the Star City access road. Highway 681 passes through Star City at the end of this segment. Highway 681 later passes through the community of Brooksby.

See also 
Roads in Saskatchewan
Transportation in Saskatchewan

References 

681